Jurgaičiai (formerly) is a village in Kėdainiai district municipality, in Kaunas County, in central Lithuania. According to the 2011 census, the village had a population of 7 people.

At the beginning of the 20th century Jurgaičiai was an okolica, a property of the  Bagdonavičiai, Ylėnai, Kelčiauskai, Krasaučiai, Kutkevičiai, Mikulšiai, Milaševičiai, Paškevičiai and Aleknavičiai families.

Archaeologist Laima Vaitkunskienė led excavations examining medieval cemeteries in the area.

Demography

References

Villages in Kaunas County
Kėdainiai District Municipality